Giovanni Battista Maremonti (died 1578) was a Roman Catholic prelate who served as Bishop of Sora (1577–1578),
Auxiliary Bishop of Ravenna (1567–1577), and Titular Bishop of Utica (1567–1577).

Biography
On 17 Mar 1567, Giovanni Battista Maremonti was appointed during the papacy of Pope Pius V as Titular Bishop of Utica and Auxiliary Bishop of Ravenna.
On 14 Aug 1577, he was appointed during the papacy of Pope Gregory XIII as Bishop of Sora.
He served as Bishop of Sora until his death in 1578.

While bishop, he was the principal consecrator of Lattanzio Lattanzi, Bishop of Pistoia (1576).

References

External links and additional sources
 (for Chronology of Bishops) 
 (for Chronology of Bishops) 

16th-century Italian Roman Catholic bishops
Bishops appointed by Pope Pius V
Bishops appointed by Pope Gregory XIII
1578 deaths